Codelobster is a portable integrated development environment (IDE) primarily for PHP, which also supports HTML, CSS, and JavaScript development. Plug-ins are available for Drupal, WordPress, Smarty, Joomla, JQuery, Facebook, Codeigniter, Yii, and CakePHP. Free registration by email is required after 30 days of use of the program, and there are paid versions also ("Lite" and "Professional") for additional features. The program is missing a help system as of its latest version.

The program features syntax highlighting and auto-completion for SQL, PHP, HTML, CSS, JavaScript, and XML, as well as automatic syntax checking. There is an HTML and CSS inspector like Firebug. It also includes Drupal support. All plugins are paid, but they offer trial periods of varying length.

References

External links 

 http://www.codelobster.com/ - The official website of Codelobster.
 http://www.techflirt.com/codelobster-review - A functional overview of Codelobster.

Integrated development environments
PHP
HTML editors
XML editors
WordPress